Darkling Ship is a 1982 fantasy role-playing game adventure published by Judges Guild for Traveller.

Plot summary
Darkling Ship is the third adventure in the Border Prowler series, following Amycus Probe and Rogue Moon of Spinstorme, and concerns the search for and discovery of a 25 million-ton generation ship by the crew of the commando transport, Hrunta.

Publication history
Darkling Ship was written by Dave Sering and was published in 1982 by Judges Guild as a 32-page book.

Reception
William A. Barton reviewed Darkling Ship in The Space Gamer No. 63. Barton commented that "If you don't mind adding some extra encounters, etc. during the exploration of the vessel, Darkling Ship may be salvageable - and could even be turned into an interesting adventure. However, I hope the next in the series (yes, there are loose ends left in the one, too) will have a bit more action in the offering."

References

Judges Guild publications
Role-playing game supplements introduced in 1982
Traveller (role-playing game) adventures